The Hartney Terrace site, also designated 20AR310 , is an archaeological site located in Alger County, Michigan. The site dates from the Woodland period, approximately 950 years before the present. It is located near a stand of wild rice. It was listed on the National Register of Historic Places in 2014.

References

Further reading

Geography of Alger County, Michigan
Archaeological sites on the National Register of Historic Places in Michigan
National Register of Historic Places in Alger County, Michigan